Keith Charles (March 4, 1934 – July 1, 2008) was an American theatre and television actor who was active from 1956 until he retired in 2003. His work included Broadway and off-Broadway roles, and television work, including recurring roles on eight soap operas. He starred in Breakfast with Les and Bess as Les.

He worked on such 1960s and 1970s soap operas as As the World Turns (Ralph Mitchell, 1977–1979, 1988–1994), The Edge of Night (Rick Oliver, 1966), The Secret Storm (Nick Kane, 1968–1970), Love of Life (Dr. Ted Chandler 1974–1975), Search for Tomorrow, and Where the Heart Is (Robert Jardin, 1972). He also worked on The Guiding Light/Guiding Light  three times in three different roles (Professor Alexander "Alex" McDaniels, 1974–1975, Dr. Frank Nelson, 1980-1981 and Brandon Spaulding, 1984) and was the first actor to play Ted Clayton on One Life to Live, for a year until he was replaced by another actor. With his wife, composer Nancy For, he was a dialogue writer for "As the World Turns" and "The Secret Storm". He played El Gallo in the original off-Broadway production of "The Fantasticks", and Potemkin in the Broadway musical "Celebration". Keith Charles also appeared in Barnaby Jones, playing a character named Marshall Eaton; episode titled "Requiem for a Son"(01/28/1973).

Charles appeared in films such as Colorforms, The Royal Tenenbaums, Longtime Companion and Drop Dead Fred.

Charles died at age 74, in New York City, from lung cancer.

Selected filmography

References 

Demetria Fulton previewed Keith Charles' appearance in Barnaby Jones, playing a character named Marshall Eaton; episode titled "Requiem for a Son"(01/28/1973).

External links

Keith Charles at the Internet Off-Broadway Database

American male stage actors
American male soap opera actors
Deaths from lung cancer in New York (state)
1934 births
2008 deaths
20th-century American male actors